Poker is a Brazilian sports equipment manufacturing company based in Rio Grande do Sul.

History 
Founded in 1986 by the Cauduro brothers, after they realized that the national sports brands did not have products for different sports categories, but concentrated all their products on just one segment. During late 1980s they have been very successful among the amateur categories of various sports. During the 90s, it invested in professional soccer, and supplied equipment to teams in the Série A.

In the 2000s the brand went through a restructuring, focusing on sponsoring athletes instead of soccer clubs. The brand also entered the swimming segment.

Sponsorships 
The following list that are or have been sponsored by Poker:

Football

Clubs teams 

  Águia
  América
  CRB
  Figueirense (1995–96)
  Fluminense 
  Grêmio 
  Joinville (1996)
  Operário
  Tuna Luso (1993–2007)

Athlets

  Aranha
  Rogério Ceni
  Sidão
  Zhang Yanru

Swimming

Athlets
  Fernando Scheffer

References

Notes

Bibliography

External links
 

Sporting goods manufacturers of Brazil
Sportswear brands
Brazilian brands
Athletic shoe brands
Clothing companies established in 1986
Companies based in Rio Grande do Sul
Sporting goods brands
1986 establishments in Brazil